Ryan Powell (born February 23, 1978 in West Carthage, New York) is a four-time All-American lacrosse player at Syracuse University and was on the US national team roster in 2006 and 2010.

Background
Powell did not begin playing organized lacrosse until he was in the seventh grade. He is the second oldest in the family behind his brother Casey Powell, and older than Michael Powell.

Powell attended Carthage Senior High School where he was the quarterback for the football team and played on the lacrosse team. In 1996, Powell chose to attend Syracuse University, following his brother Casey.

At Syracuse, he was a four-time All-American (his brother Casey was also a four-time All-American). After his college career he was drafted third in the 2000 MLL draft. He currently plays for the Boston Blazers of the National Lacrosse League (indoor lacrosse) and the Denver Outlaws of Major League Lacrosse (outdoor). His brothers Casey and Mike also have enjoyed successful lacrosse careers. Powell owns and operates both Rhino Lacrosse and Powell Lacrosse. He was sponsored by Warrior Lacrosse with his brother Casey up until 2004-2005. After leaving Warrior, Ryan is now a prominent figure and representative for Brine Lacrosse. Still living in Oregon, Powell's entire income comes solely from lacrosse. Powell lives with his fiancé Marlee and still is being an innovator of the game through education as opposed to playing, whether it is from the NLL, the MLL, or from the Powell Brother's Lacrosse Camps.

Professional career

MLL
Powell has played in Major League Lacrosse since 2001. He played for the Rochester Rattlers from 2001 to 2005, and the San Francisco Dragons in 2006 and 2007. In 2001 Powell earned MVP for the 2001 MLL season. In 2006, Powell was awarded both the Major League Lacrosse Offensive Player of the Year Award and the MVP. He is the second lacrosse player to receive the MVP award twice, (John Grant Jr. did as well (NLL: '07, '12 MLL: '07, '08)). Prior to the 2008 MLL season, the San Francisco Dragons traded Powell to the Denver Outlaws in exchange for draft picks. He, Casey, and Mike all sat out for the 2009 MLL season, as they did not report to their respective teams by the contract deadline. This was Powell's first season sitting out, while it was Casey's second, and Mike's third.

NLL
Powell also plays indoor lacrosse in the National Lacrosse League with the Boston Blazers.

Team USA
Powell competed in the World Lacrosse Championships in 2006, and 2010. In 2006 the USA fell to Canada. He was the captain of 2010 team, which won the Gold medal.

Coaching career
In 2004, he helped take Syracuse University to another National Championship while being an assistant coach.

In 2005, Powell founded Rhino lacrosse in Portland, Oregon.

In 2021, Powell was named the head coach for Christian Brothers Academy in Syracuse.

Accolades and awards

High school accolades
 All American
 2x Empire State team member
 5th All-time leading scorer in New York State High school history
 244 Goals, 185 Assists, 429 Points

College accolades
 Tied for 2nd all-time for scoring in Syracuse Lacrosse History (287 points)
 Winner of the Lt. Raymond J. Enners Award as the Division I National Player of the Year
 Winner of the Lt. Col. Jack Turnbull Award as the Division I National Attackman of the Year in 2000.

Professional accolades
 2001 MLL MVP
 2006 MLL MVP
 2006 MLL Offensive Player of the Year
 2008 MLL All Star Game MVP
 Rochester Rattlers All Time Leading Scorer
 6 x MLL All Star
He was the first player in MLL history to earn both the Offensive Player of the Year and Bud Light MVP awards in the same season.

In 2018, Powell was inducted into the National Lacrosse Hall of Fame.

Statistics

NLL

MLL

NCAA

 (a) 17th in NCAA Division I career assists
 (b) 10th in NCAA Division I career points

Other
He is the first fully endorsed Nike lacrosse athlete.

See also
Casey Powell
Mike Powell
List of family relations in the National Lacrosse League
NCAA Men's Division I Lacrosse Records
Syracuse Orange men's lacrosse

References

External links
Interview with Powell on CaptainU

1978 births
Living people
American lacrosse players
Buffalo Bandits players
Edmonton Rush players
Major League Lacrosse major award winners
Major League Lacrosse players
National Lacrosse League All-Stars
People from Jefferson County, New York
Portland LumberJax players
Lacrosse players from New York (state)
Syracuse Orange men's lacrosse players
Boston Blazers players
Anaheim Storm players
Syracuse Orange men's lacrosse coaches